Andrew Clive Evans (born 1 May 1957) is an English former footballer who played as midfielder for Tranmere Rovers, Wigan Athletic, Crewe Alexandra, Stockport County and Lincoln City. He now lives in West Kirby with his family and is employed in the sports promotion industry.

References

1957 births
Living people
People from Heswall
English footballers
Association football midfielders
Tranmere Rovers F.C. players
English Football League players
Wigan Athletic F.C. players
Crewe Alexandra F.C. players
Stockport County F.C. players
Lincoln City F.C. players
Bangor City F.C. players